The 2021 Sun Bowl was a college football bowl game played on December 31, 2021, with kickoff at 12:00 p.m. EST (10:00 a.m. local MST) and televised on CBS. It was the 87th edition of the Sun Bowl (after the 2020 edition was cancelled due to the COVID-19 pandemic), and was one of the 2021–22 bowl games concluding the 2021 FBS football season. Sponsored by Kellogg's Frosted Flakes breakfast cereal, the game was officially known as the Tony the Tiger Sun Bowl, after its mascot, Tony the Tiger.

On December 26, the Miami Hurricanes announced that they would not be able to play in the game, due to COVID-19 issues; organizers stated that they would try to secure a replacement team to face the Washington State Cougars.

On December 27, the Central Michigan Chippewas were named as the Sun Bowl replacement team. The Chippewas had originally been scheduled to face the Boise State Broncos in the Arizona Bowl, until Boise State withdrew from that bowl due to COVID-19 issues.

Teams
The bowl has tie-ins with the Atlantic Coast Conference (ACC) and the Pac-12 Conference. The originally planned matchup featured teams from those conferences. The withdrawal of the Miami Hurricanes, an ACC team, led to Central Michigan, a team from the Mid-American Conference (MAC), being selected to face Washington State of the Pac-12. This was the first time Central Michigan and Washington State played each other.

Washington State Cougars

Washington State finished their regular season with a 7–5 record, 6–3 in Pac-12 play. After losing three of their first four games, the Cougars won six of their final eight games. They faced one ranked opponent during the season, losing to Oregon in mid-November. Washington State had previously appeared in two Sun Bowls, winning the 2001 and 2015 editions.

Central Michigan Chippewas

Central Michigan finished their regular season with an 8–4 record, 6–2 in MAC play. After losing three of their first five games, they had only a single loss in their final seven games. They did not face any ranked opponents during the season. This was the first Sun Bowl appearance for Central Michigan.

Game summary
The bowl's attendance was the lowest for a Sun Bowl since the 1982 edition.

Statistics

References

External links
 Game statistics at statbroadcast.com
 Digital game program via publogix.com

Sun Bowl
Sun Bowl
Central Michigan Chippewas football bowl games
Washington State Cougars football bowl games
Sun Bowl
Sun Bowl